Los Angeles is the debut studio album by American rock band X, released on April 26, 1980, by Slash Records. It was produced by ex-Doors keyboardist Ray Manzarek and includes a cover of the 1967 Doors song "Soul Kitchen".

Los Angeles placed at No. 16 in The Village Voices 1980 Pazz & Jop critics' poll. In 2003, the album was ranked No. 286 on ''Rolling Stones list of the 500 greatest albums of all time.

In 1988, Slash issued Los Angeles and Wild Gift jointly on a single CD. It was reissued by Rhino Records in 2001 with five bonus tracks.

Critical reception

Los Angeles was reviewed very positively from its first release. Ken Tucker wrote in Rolling Stone that it "is a powerful, upsetting work that concludes with a confrontation of the band's own rampaging bitterness and confusion." Robert Christgau of The Village Voice wrote that their outlook and songs "make a smart argument for a desperately stupid scene." AllMusic's retrospective review concluded that the album "is considered by many to be one of punk's all-time finest recordings, and with good reason."

For the year of its release, Los Angeles placed at No. 16 on the Christgau-organized Village Voice Pazz & Jop critics' poll. Los Angeles Times critic Robert Hilburn named it one of the ten best albums released between 1977 and 1987. Subsequently, Los Angeles was ranked No. 24 on Rolling Stones 1989 list of the 100 best albums of the 1980s, and Pitchfork ranked it 91st on its 2002 list of the decade's top 100 albums. The former also ranked it #286 on its list of the 500 greatest albums of all time in 2003, dropping it to #287 in the 2012 update of the list, and to #320 in the 2020 update. In 2012, Slant Magazine placed Los Angeles at No. 98 on its list of the 100 best albums of the 1980s. The title track was included in the Rock and Roll Hall of Fame's list of "500 Songs That Shaped Rock and Roll".

In pop culture
The album's title track featured in the series finale of The Shield and has made numerous video game appearances, including the soundtrack to Tony Hawk's Underground 2, as downloadable content in Rock Band, and as a cover version in Guitar Hero Encore: Rocks the 80s. However, the uses of the words "nigger" and "shit" were censored, while the Guitar Hero version used the second verse as the first and second verse. The uncensored version of the song appeared in the next-gen versions of Grand Theft Auto V.
"Los Angeles" is mentioned at the very end of Bret Easton Ellis's debut novel, Less than Zero.
"Nausea" was performed in the 1981 rockumentary The Decline of Western Civilization, and later in 2008 in the Germs biopic film What We Do Is Secret.
In 1994 The X-Files episode "3", "The Unheard Music" was heard in the background during the Club Tepes scene.

Track listing

PersonnelXJohn Doe – bass, lead vocals
Exene – vocals
Billy Zoom – guitar
D.J. Bonebrake – drumsAdditional personnelRay Manzarek – organ on "Nausea", "The Unheard Music" and "The World's a Mess; It's in My Kiss"; synthesizer on "Sex and Dying in High Society"; production

References

External links
40th anniversary retrospective by Discogs.com

X (American band) albums
1980 debut albums
Slash Records albums
Albums produced by Ray Manzarek